Meguro motorcycles were built by Meguro Manufacturing Co motorcycle works (目黒製作所), founded by Hobuji Murato and a high-ranking naval officer, Takaji Suzuki, in 1937.  One of the first Japanese motorcycle companies, it became a partner of Kawasaki Heavy Industries Ltd, and was eventually absorbed.  Named after a district of Tokyo, Meguro had its roots in Murato Iron Works, which was established in 1924.  Meguro Seisakusho, which had once developed a copy of a Harley-Davidson V-twin, was established to design and build gearboxes for the nascent Japanese motorcycle industry.  Abe Industries, which had once produced its own motorcycle, merged with Meguro in 1931. The brand is being revived by Kawasaki with a new K3 model to be introduced in Japan on February 1, 2021.

Once a prestige brand, supplying the Japanese government with military and police motorcycles, and racing alongside Honda, Meguro (メグロ) became bankrupt after launching a range of lightweight motorcycles which sold poorly, and experiencing a yearlong labor strike.  The Society of Automotive Engineers of Japan, Inc. rates the Meguro Z97 model introduced in 1937 as one of their 240 Landmarks of Japanese Automotive Technology.

History

Although the first motorcycle arrived in Japan in 1895, it was not until the 1930s that its own motorcycle industry started to develop.

After the Wall Street Crash, Meguro invested in Harley-Davidson and obtained drawings, tooling and important knowledge of metal heat treatments in order to make gearboxes. These were then used in their vehicles and those of another early Japanese company called Rikuo (literally "Road King"). The resulting transfer of American intellectual property taught the Japanese how to produce motorcycles in quantity. In 1935, Murato and Suzuki built a 500 cc single Z97 model based on a Swiss Motosacoche design but work was restricted due to the start of WW2, during which it supplied aircraft parts. Meguro started full production again in 1948, the Z97 being joined by 125 cc, 250 cc and 350 cc overhead valve singles.

In the 1950s Meguro entered racing and built its first twin-cylinder design, the  T1 "Senior" with a British design-inspired pre-unit parallel twin engine; and later the K-series "Stamina" model, a copy of the BSA A7, one of which Meguro had bought in 1953. Its quality and engineering was superior to the BSA and it was described by Edward Turner, one of Britain's most talented motorcycle designers, as "too good to be true". For the first time, the Japanese motorcycle industry was seen as a threat. Its other models designed in collaboration with Kawasaki were entirely of Japanese design.

Meguro raced the 500 cc overhead camshaft single cylinder model at the Asama Kazan speedway circuit in Tsumagoi, Gunma Prefecture. For many years, the company was only outsold by Honda.

In 1958 Meguro developed a range of 50 cc, 125 cc, 250 cc and 350 cc consumer products which failed in the market due to its being too expensive.

In 1960, by which time it was Japan's longest running motorcycle company out of the hundreds that had once flourished producing copies of European models, the company became affiliated with the Kawasaki Aircraft company. It first changed its name in 1962 to Kawasaki-Meguro, which produced the successful B8 125 cc; then in October 1964, seeing the commercial and marketing value of having a motorcycle producing division alongside its heavy industry services and particularly its already established sales outlets, Kawasaki took full control of the company having learnt all it needed to know. Together they started produced "Kawasaki-Meguro Works" 125 cc, 175 cc and 250 cc single cylinder vehicles. The 500 cc K-series twin cylinder model was later enlarged and developed into the 625 cc Kawasaki W series. The latter model were used as official vehicles for government purposes.

Models

 Parallel 2-cylinder 650 cc
Meguro T1 Senior 1955-1960. OHV parallel twin-cylinder 650 cc which is said to have had a strongest influence on the Kawasaki W-series.

Meguro T2 Senior 1957-1960. Variant of T1

Meguro-Kawasaki 650 X 1966. Prototype only, for the 12th 1966 Tokyo Motor Show
 Single-cylinder 500 cc
Meguro Z97 1937–1938. The company's first model, a 500 cc OHV single cylinder.

Meguro Z98 1938–1941.  Improved of the Z97, a OHV single cylinder 600 cc or 500 cc.

Meguro Z1 1947–1951. Similar to the pre-war Z98.

Meguro Z2 1951–1952. Meguro Z1 with hydraulic front fork.

Meguro Z3 1952–1953. Meguro Z2 with improvement to rear suspension.

Meguro Z5 1953–1955. Four-speed gearbox ("Z4" was not used because in Japanese its sounds like a taboo word, 4 meaning death).

Meguro Z6 1955–1956. Major engine improvements meaning it reached 20 horsepower and became the model adopted by the Japanese government.

Meguro Z7 "Stamina" 1956–1960. The last single cylinder Meguro.
 Parallel 2-cylinder 500 cc
Meguro K "Stamina" 1960–1965. Exhibited at the 1960 Tokyo Motor Show. 39 horsepower.

Kawasaki 500/Meguro K2 1965–1966. Kawasaki Heavy Industries variant of Meguro K-series.
 Single-cylinder 350 cc
Meguro Y "Rex" 1953–1956. Smaller and lighter model based on the 1956 Meguro Z.  OHV single-cylinder engine producing 13 horsepower.

Meguro Y2 "Rex" 1957–1959. A steel framed variant of Meguro Y. Output increased to 16 horsepower.
 Single-cylinder 325 cc

Meguro FY 1959–1962. Sports model.

Meguro YA "Argus" 1959–1962. Improved version of FY.
 Single-cylinder 300 cc
Meguro J3/J3A "Junior" 1952–1956.

Meguro J-8 "Argus" 1963. Changes to exhaust system.
 Single-cylinder 250 cc
Meguro J "Junior" 1950–1951. Japan's first 250 cc bike. Rigid rear suspension but with a hydraulic front fork.

Meguro J2 "Junior" 1951–1952. A variant of Meguro J. From 1952 the model is equipped with rear suspension. OHV pushrod engine.

Meguro S "Junior" 1953–1954. The Meguro J series was upgraded to 350 cc and so a new model name was established for the 250 cc class.

Meguro S2 "Junior" 1954–1956. A variant of Meguro S with the first four speed gearbox.

Meguro S3 "Junior" 1956–1959. Best selling model in the 250 cc series.

Meguro F 1958–1960. OHC model.

Meguro S5 "Junior" 1959. OHV engine model introduced due to sluggish sales of the Meguro F.

Meguro S7 "Junior" 1960–1963. 12V electrical equipment with battery.

Meguro S-8 "Junior" 1962–1964. Last of the Meguro S series with rear suspension.

Meguro AT "Auto Track" 1962–1964. Based on Meguro S3.
Kawasaki-Meguro 250 SG 1964–1969. The last model sold with the brand name of Meguro. Inspired the Kawasaki Estrella model.

Influence on Kawasaki retro models

In 1999 Kawasaki launched the W650 675 cc parallel twin retro style motorcycle inspired by the W2 and a 250 cc single cylinder four stroke Estrella inspired by an early Meguro model. Kawasaki discontinued the W650 in 2007 but replaced it in 2011 with an enlarged version, the 773cc W800.

Revival of Brand
On December 8, 2020, Kawasaki announced the revival of the Meguro brand, with a new model available on February 1, 2021. The new model will be called the K3 and is based on the existing W800. Both bikes will be mechanically identical, but the K3 will be visually distinct and sell at a higher price point.

References

Motorcycles of Japan
Motorcycles by brand
Motorcycle manufacturers of Japan